Daura-Suruwal (दौरा सुरुवाल) is one of the national outfit of Nepalese men. The coat was added to the costume by Jang Bahadur Rana, a prime minister of Nepal in the 19th century. The outfit is also popular in Darjeeling in neighbouring India amongst people of Indian Gorkha origin.

History

Daura Suruwal is a modern variant of the Tapālan (Nepal Bhasa: तपालं) which has been the traditional clothing of Newar men. It used to be traditionally worn as men's common costume consisting of a long shirt called tapālan with tight fitting trousers known as suruwā (Nepal Bhasa: सुरुवा:). A waistcoat or a coat along with a cap called tapulī / topī (Nepal Bhasa: तपुली) would complete the garb.

Style
In Nepal, the traditional male dress, which is also the national dress, is the Nepali shirt called daura and suruwal or daura-suruwal suit. According to Hussein (2018), "the daura is a closed-neck shirt with five pleats and eight strings that serve to tie it around the body". 

The upper garment is similar to the Gujarati kediyu, but does not have the pleats going across the chest, but has cross-tied flaps.  
 
The Nepali suruwa/suruwal is a combination of the churidar and the lower garment worn in the coastal regions of Gujarat, especially Saurashtra and Kutch where the garment is also called suruwal (and chorno/kafni). It is tight along the legs but wide at the hips.  However, the suruwal fits comfortably around the legs so that it can be tapered tightly around the ankles.

The Nepalese Prime Minister Bir Shamsher Jang Bahadur Rana wore the Daura-Suruwal on an unofficial visit to the United Kingdom in the 19th century, which popularised the costume further in Nepal. Janga Bahadur Rana introduced the coat to Nepal in the 19th century. He was presented a coat by the then Queen of the United Kingdom, as a gift. He started the tradition of wearing a coat with the Daura suruwal. Men also wear the Daura Suruwal with a waistcoat.

Religious beliefs
The Daura has eight strings used to tie the Daura which are denoted as Astamatrika-Singini: 
 Byagini
 Kumari
 Barahi
 Brahmayani
 Indrayani
 Maheshowri
 Byasnabi
 Mahalaxmi

According to Nepali mythology, eight is a lucky number. The pleats or Kallis signify the Pancha Buddha or Pancha Ratna. The closed neck of the Daura signifies the snake around the Lord Shiva’s neck.

References

External links
history of the Daura-Suruwal at ECSNepal

Nepalese clothing
Folk costumes
National symbols of Nepal
Culture of Sikkim